Mahomet the Imposter is a 1744 tragedy by the British writer James Miller. His final play, it was inspired by the 1736 French work Mahomet by Voltaire. It was Miller's only tragedy, as his other works were sentimental comedies. The title is sometimes spelt as Mahomet the Impostor.

The original Drury Lane cast included David Garrick as Zaphna, Dennis Delane as Mahomet, Henry Giffard as Alcanor, Richard Winstone as Pharon and Anna Marcella Giffard as Palmira.

References

Bibliography
 Nicoll, Allardyce. A History of Early Eighteenth Century Drama: 1700-1750. CUP Archive, 1927.

1744 plays
Tragedy plays
West End plays
Plays by James Miller
Cultural depictions of Muhammad